A fenestra (fenestration; plural fenestrae or fenestrations) is any small opening or pore, commonly used as a term in the biological sciences. It is the Latin word for "window", and is used in various fields to describe a pore in an anatomical structure.

Biological morphology 
In morphology, fenestrae are found in cancellous bones, particularly in the skull. In anatomy, the round window and oval window are also known as the fenestra rotunda and the fenestra ovalis. In microanatomy, fenestrae are found in endothelium of fenestrated capillaries, enabling the rapid exchange of molecules between the blood and surrounding tissue. The elastic layer of the tunica intima is a fenestrated membrane. In surgery, a fenestration is a new opening made in a part of the body to enable drainage or access.

Plant biology and mycology 

In plant biology, the perforations in a perforate leaf are also described as fenestrae, and the leaf is called a fenestrate leaf.  The leaf window is also known as a fenestra, and is a translucent structure that transmits light, as in Fenestraria.

Examples of fenestrate structures in the fungal kingdom include the symmetrically arranged gaps in the indusium ("skirt") of the mushroom Phallus duplicatus, and the thallus of the coral lichen Pulchrocladia retipora.

Zoology 
In zoology, the trilobite Fenestraspis possessed extensive fenestrae in the posterior part of the body. In the paleognathae, there is an ilio–ischiatic fenestra.

Fenestrae are also used to distinguish the three types of amniote:

See also 
 Fenestron, a shrouded tail rotor of a helicopter

References

Anatomy
Biology
Angiology
Fungal morphology and anatomy

sv:Fenestrae